Juliusz Paweł Schauder (21 September 1899, Lwów, Austria-Hungary  – September 1943, Lwów, Occupied Poland) was a Polish mathematician of Jewish origin, known for his work in functional analysis, partial differential equations and mathematical physics.

Life and career
Born on 21 September 1899 in Lwów, he was drafted into the Austro-Hungarian Army right after his graduation from school and saw action on the Italian front. He was captured and imprisoned in Italy. He entered the university in Lwów in 1919 and received his doctorate in 1923. He got no appointment at the university and continued his research while working as teacher at a secondary school. Due to his outstanding results, he obtained a scholarship in 1932 that allowed him to spend several years in Leipzig and, especially, Paris. In Paris he started a very successful collaboration with Jean Leray.  Around 1935 Schauder obtained the position of a senior assistant in the University of Lwów. Schauder, along with Stanisław Mazur, was an Invited Speaker of the ICM in 1936 in Oslo.

Schauder was Jewish, and after the invasion of German troops in Lwów 1941 it was impossible for him to continue his work. Even before the Lwów ghetto was established he wrote to Ludwig Bieberbach pleading for his support. Instead, Bieberbach passed his letter to the Gestapo and Schauder was arrested. In his letters to Swiss mathematicians, he wrote that he had important new results, but no paper to write them down.  He was executed by the Gestapo, probably in October 1943.

Most of his mathematical work is in the field of functional analysis, being part of a large Polish group of mathematicians, i.e. Lwów School of Mathematics. They were pioneers in this area with wide applications in all parts of modern analysis. Schauder is best known for the Schauder fixed-point theorem which is a major tool to prove the existence of solutions in various problems, the Schauder bases (a generalization of an orthonormal basis from Hilbert spaces to Banach spaces), and the Leray−Schauder principle, a way to establish solutions of partial differential equations from a priori estimates.

In memoriam
The Schauder Medal is awarded by the J.P. Schauder Center for Nonlinear Studies at the Nicolaus Copernicus University in Toruń, Poland, to individuals for their significant achievements related to topological methods in nonlinear analysis.

See also
Banach–Schauder theorem
Schauder basis
Schauder estimates
Schauder fixed point theorem
List of Polish mathematicians

References

External links
 
 
 
 Juliusz P. Schauder Center for Nonlinear Studies

1899 births
1943 deaths
Academic staff of the University of Lviv
Jews from Galicia (Eastern Europe)
Lwów School of Mathematics
Blue Army (Poland) personnel
Polish Jews who died in the Holocaust
PDE theorists
Functional analysts